The 83rd Precinct Police Station and Stable is a historic police station and stable located at the corner of DeKalb and Wilson Avenues in Bushwick, Brooklyn, New York City.  It was built in 1894 in the Romanesque Revival style to a design by William Tubby.

It was designated a landmark by the New York City Landmarks Preservation Commission in 1977, and was listed on the National Register of Historic Places in 1982. It currently houses NYPD Patrol Borough Brooklyn North.

References

Government buildings on the National Register of Historic Places in New York City
Government buildings completed in 1894
Infrastructure completed in 1894
Government buildings in Brooklyn
Romanesque Revival architecture in New York City
Police stations on the National Register of Historic Places
Bushwick, Brooklyn
National Register of Historic Places in Brooklyn
New York City Police Department buildings
1894 establishments in New York (state)